Nyssocarinus is a genus of beetles in the family Cerambycidae, containing the following species:

 Nyssocarinus bondari (Melzer, 1927)
 Nyssocarinus humeralis Monné, 1985
 Nyssocarinus vittatus Gilmour, 1960

References

Acanthocinini